Ida Storm (born 11 October 1991) is a Swedish hammer thrower. She competed in the women's hammer throw at the 2017 World Championships in Athletics.

References

External links

1991 births
Living people
Swedish female hammer throwers
World Athletics Championships athletes for Sweden
Place of birth missing (living people)
Female weight throwers